Bloomfield Hospital may refer to:
Bloomfield Health Campus, a campus of the Orange Health Service in Orange, New South Wales, Australia, formerly known as Bloomfield Hospital.
Bloomfield Hospital (Ireland), a mental health hospital in Dublin, Ireland.